Neolitsea aciculata is a species of small evergreen tree (trunk up to ) in the family Lauraceae. It is found in Japan and Taiwan. In Taiwan, it grows often in mixed coniferous and broad-leaved forests in valleys throughout the island.

References

aciculata
Trees of Japan
Trees of Taiwan